Bonnefontaine is a commune in the Jura department in Bourgogne-Franche-Comté in eastern France.

Geography
Bonnefontaine is located in the core of the first plateau of the Jura on the edge of the Côte de l'Heute to 580 meters of altitude. In addition to its centre, the village includes a hamlet : Le Patouillet. The local agriculture is traditionally dairy breeding used for the manufacture of a regional cheese, the Comté.

History
Until 1897, the name of the village was "Les Faisses" (similar to fesses : buttocks, in French).  On that date, this name, considered as defamatory was replaced by Bonnefontaine, in reference to the three stone fountains of the village.

Population

Sights
Several remarkable monuments deserve to be mentioned : three fountains; a beautiful church of the 15th century with a lava roof; a mansion with a tower and a stone turret; and a convent of Dominican sisters whose garden is registered with the pre-inventory of the historic buildings. Moreover, the old chalet (co-operative cheese dairy) was turned into the "Maison du Premier plateau" which shelters the seat of the Community of the "Communauté de Communes du Premier Plateau", a tourist information center and a showroom.

Economy
Three companies are situated in Bonnefontaine : a sheep-fold, a tablettery and a farm located at the "Patouillet", hamlet being with less than 500 meters of the village.

Gallery

See also
 Communes of the Jura department

References

External links
  Communauté de communes Bresse Haute Seille

Communes of Jura (department)